The GeeksPhone Revolution is a smartphone released by GeeksPhone in January 2014. It uses the x86 architecture and PCI bus instead of the ARM architecture.  It is capable of running either Android or Firefox OS, but lacks a dual boot facility.

See also
Comparison of Firefox OS devices

References

Firefox OS
Firefox OS devices
Android (operating system) devices
Linux-based devices
Mobile Linux
Open-source mobile phones
Smartphones